The Buena Vista Stakes is a Grade II American Thoroughbred horse race for fillies and mares aged four years old or older over the distance of one mile on the turf scheduled annually in February at Santa Anita Park in Arcadia, California.  The event currently carries a purse of $200,000.

History 
The inaugural running of the event was on 5 March 1988 as the Buena Vista Handicap with the Julio Canani trained Davie's Lamb ridden by Fernando Toro winning comfortably by  lengths in a time of 1:39 flat.

In 1990 the event was classified as a Grade III.

The Buena Vista Handicap was run in two divisions in 1992.

The event was upgraded to Grade II status in 1995.

The event run as a handicap through 2012 but since has been run under allowance weight conditions and renamed to the Buena Vista Stakes.

It was taken off the turf and run on the dirt course in 2017 due to poor conditions on the turf course. When a graded stakes is taken off the turf, the race is automatically downgraded one level for that running only. After the race, the American Graded Stakes Committee meets to review the race's running and determine if its former status should be reinstated. In the case of the 2017 Buena Vista Stakes, it was decided that the race's status would not be reinstated and as such it was recorded as a Grade III event.

Records
Speed  record:
 1:33.33 - Pontchatrain (2014)

Margins:
 lengths – Wild At Heart (2017)

Most wins:
 No horse has won this race more than once.

Most wins by an owner:
 4 - Juddmonte Farms (1994, 1997, 2008, 2009)

Most wins by a jockey:
 5 - Gary Stevens (1996, 2004, 2014, 2015, 2016)

Most wins by a trainer:
 5 - Robert J. Frankel (1994, 1997, 2003, 2008, 2009)

Winners

Legend:

 
 
 

Notes:

† In 1994, Lady Blessington (FR) won the race but was disqualified later after a positive swab of scopalamine and placed ninth (last). All prize money was redistributed with first place awarded to Skimble

See also
List of American and Canadian Graded races

References

Flat horse races for four-year-old fillies
Graded stakes races in the United States
Grade 2 stakes races in the United States
Turf races in the United States
Mile category horse races for fillies and mares
Horse races in California
Recurring sporting events established in 1988
Santa Anita Park
1988 establishments in California